NGC 5838 is a lenticular galaxy in the constellation Virgo, discovered by William Herschel in 1786. It is a member of the Virgo III Groups, a series of galaxies and galaxy clusters strung out to the east of the Virgo Supercluster of galaxies.

References

External links
 
 HubbleSite Newscenter Hubble picture and information on NGC 5838

Lenticular galaxies
5838
53862
09692
Virgo (constellation)